Ashlar Ridge is a ridge in Alberta, Canada.

The ridge has the character of an ashlar wall, hence the name.

References

Ridges of Alberta